Epiphany may refer to:

 Epiphany (feeling), an experience of sudden and striking insight

Religion
 Epiphany (holiday), a Christian holiday celebrating the revelation of God the Son as a human being in Jesus Christ
 Epiphany season, or Epiphanytide, the liturgical season following the Christian holiday
 Theophany, the manifestation of a deity in an observable way
 Epiphany (Ancient Greece)

Computing
 Epiphany, Inc., a software development company, formerly known as E.piphany
 Epiphany, the code name, and former name, of GNOME Web
 Epiphany, a multi-core processor made by Adapteva

Art
 The Epiphany (Bosch), a triptych and earlier panel painting Epiphany by Hieronymus Bosch
 Epiphany (painting), by Dutch painter Gerbrand van den Eeckhout
 Epifania, a drawing by Michelangelo

Literature
 Epiphany (literature), epiphany as a literary device
 Epiphany (novel), a 1997 novel by David Hewson
 "Epiphany", a 1999 short story by Connie Willis

Film and television
 "Epiphany" (Angel), a 2001 episode of Angel
 "Epiphany" (Stargate Atlantis), a 2005 episode of Stargate Atlantis
 "Epiphany" (Desperate Housewives), a 2010 episode of Desperate Housewives
 "Epiphany", a 1989 episode of War of the Worlds
 "Epiphanies" (Babylon 5), a 1997 episode of Babylon 5
 "Epiphanies" (Battlestar Galactica), a 2006 episode of Battlestar Galactica
 "Epiphanies", a 1999 episode of Spaced
 Epiphany Johnson, a character on the American soap opera General Hospital
 Epiphany Proudfoot, a character in the film Angel Heart played by Lisa Bonet

Music

Classical music
 Epifanie (Berio), a musical composition by the Italian composer Luciano Berio

Albums
 Epiphany: The Best of Chaka Khan, Vol. 1, 1996 compilation album by Chaka Khan
 Epiphany (T-Pain album), 2007 album by T-Pain
 Epiphany (Ian Villafana album), 2010 album by Ian Villafana
 Epiphany (Manafest album), 2005 album by Manafest
 Epiphany (Chrisette Michele album), 2009 album by R&B singer Chrisette Michele
 Epiphany (Judith Durham album), a 2011 album by Australian Judith Durham

Songs
 "Epiphany" (Chrisette Michele song), 2009
 "Epiphany" (Taylor Swift song), 2020
"Epiphany" (BTS song), 2018
 "Epiphany", a song by Bad Religion from their 2002 album The Process of Belief
 "Epiphany", a song by Staind from their 2001 album Break the Cycle
 "Epiphany", a song by Bowling For Soup from their 2006 album The Great Burrito Extortion Case
 "Epiphany", a song by The Ocean from their 2010 album Heliocentric
 "Epiphany", a song by Trans Siberian Orchestra from their 2010 album Night Castle
 "Epiphany", a song by The Word Alive from their 2010 album Deceiver
 "Epiphany", a song by Stephen Sondheim in his musical Sweeney Todd: The Demon Barber of Fleet Street
 "Epiphany", a song on the film soundtrack Crank: High Voltage
 "Epiphany", a song by Intervals from their 2012 EP In Time
 "Epiphany", a song by Trent Reznor and Atticus Ross, from their score of Pixar’s 2020 film Soul

People
 Epiphany (wrestler), American professional wrestler
 Epiphanny Prince (born 1988), basketball player
 John of Epiphania, sixth-century Byzantine historian

See also
 "The Feast of Epiphany", a 2008 episode of Brothers & Sisters
 Tiffany (given name)
 Epiphanes (disambiguation)